Evelyn M. Richardson, born Evelyn May Fox (1902–1976) was a Canadian writer who won the Governor General's Award in non-fiction for her 1945 memoir, We Keep a Light. The annual Evelyn Richardson Memorial Literary Award is given in her honour to a Nova Scotia writer of non-fiction.

Life
She was born on Emerald Isle and raised on Cape Sable Island, the daughter of Hattie (Larkin) and Arthur Douglas Fox. Her father was a teacher. She attended high school at Halifax Academy in Halifax, Nova Scotia and later studied at Dalhousie University in that city, earning a Bachelor of Arts degree. She taught at several schools before marrying Morrill Richardson in 1926. For a time they lived in Massachusetts. In 1929 they returned to Nova Scotia where Morrill Richardson had purchased the  Bon Portage Island near Shag Harbour, where he took over duties as the lightkeeper. There, they spent the next thirty-five years.

While raising three children and helping to run the lighthouse, she embarked on a writing career, penning several books and numerous articles, many which chronicled her experiences on the island. She wrote in winter when there were few interruptions from visitors.  They left the island in 1964 when the light was mechanized.  In her retirement, she lived near Barrington, Nova Scotia.

The Evelyn Richardson Memorial School in Shag Harbour was named in her memory. Bon Portage Island is now owned by Acadia University and is used by students for biological research.

She won the Ryerson Fiction Award in 1953 for Desired Haven.

Publications
Many of her books are still in print.

Non-fiction
 We Keep a Light, Toronto: Ryerson, 1945
 We Bought an Island, Philadelphia: Macrae Smith, 1954 
 My Other Islands, Toronto: Ryerson, 1960
 Living island, Toronto: Ryerson, 1965
 A Voyage to Australia, 1976
 B ... was for Butter and Enemy Craft, Halifax: Petheric, 1976 (posthumous)

Fiction
 Desired Haven, Toronto: Ryerson, 1953
 No Small Tempest, Toronto: Ryerson, 1957.

Collections
 Where my roots go deep: The collected writings of Evelyn M. Richardson, Halifax: Nimbus, 1996.

Further reading
 Evelyn Richardson Fonds, Nova Scotia Archives and Records Management, Halifax, Nova Scotia

References

External links
 Bon Portage Lighthouse

Writers from Nova Scotia
Governor General's Award-winning non-fiction writers
1902 births
1976 deaths
Canadian women novelists
20th-century Canadian novelists
People from Shelburne County, Nova Scotia
Canadian memoirists
Canadian women memoirists
20th-century Canadian women writers
20th-century memoirists